The River Swilly is a river in County Donegal, Ireland, which flows in an eastern direction through Letterkenny. Letterkenny, the largest town in County Donegal, is built on the river and became the first crossing point on the river in the 17th century.

History
The river takes its name Súileach from a man-eating water monster that was chopped in half by Saint Columba, who was born in Gartan. Letterkenny DJ and Producer Diarmuid O'Doherty produced a song, "A Monster in the River Swilly", about this legend.

Course
A number of 'burns' flow into the river throughout its course. These include the Forglug Burn, which flows into the river just to the south of Conwal Cemetery, and the Correnagh Burn, which flows under the Derry Road (part of the N56), entering the river at Bonagee on the eastern edge of Letterkenny.

Navigation and use
A shipping industry once operated on the Swilly in Letterkenny. The river was extremely hard for larger ships to navigate, as it was narrow and has many bends near Letterkenny. The port was closed to commercial shipping in the 1960s and its warehouses were demolished in 2001. The coal yard still remains on the old site opposite the Mount Errigal Hotel. Newmills Corn and Flax Mills is powered by the waters of the river.

Fishing
The Swilly traditionally produced approximately 300–400 salmon per year. The river is considered one of the best fishing rivers in the northwest of Ireland.

Crossings
The Swilly is spanned by numerous bridges mostly open to road traffic. In Letterkenny there are four bridges across the river:

Devlin Way 

Devlin Way was the first pedestrian bridge built over the River Swilly. The bridge was installed on 25 October 2006 in Letterkenny. The bridge connects the suburban Oldtown area with the town centre. It was designed by TS McLaughlin Structural Engineers and the ironwork was constructed by Bonnar Engineering. The bridge cost €100,000 to construct. A maroon-coloured cambered steel structure which measures 28 metres long and 2.2 metres wide, the new bridge proves a major impact on the safety of pedestrians, especially OAPs and school-going children. It is lit by a lamp cast from iron and it also contains a commemorative stone seat with a plaque. The bridge is a neighbour to the much older and well-known Oldtown Bridge.

The bridge was officially opened on 14 November 2006 by local councillor Ciaran Brogan. The bridge is named in honour of the Devlin family who live beside the bridge and sacrificed part of their land so that the bridge could be built.

References

External links

irelandnorthwest.ie

Bridges in the Republic of Ireland
Geography of Letterkenny
Swilly